The broadstriped barb (Enteromius annectens) is a species of ray-finned fish in the genus Enteromius.

It is known to be widely distributed on the coastal plain of south-east Africa, but may be a species complex.

Footnotes 

 

Enteromius
Fish described in 1917
Cyprinid fish of Africa
Taxa named by John Dow Fisher Gilchrist
Taxa named by William Wardlaw Thompson